Pseudopostega ecuadoriana is a moth of the family Opostegidae. It was described by Donald R. Davis and Jonas R. Stonis, 2007. It is known from an Amazonian premontane rainforest in east-central Ecuador.

The length of the forewings is about 3.3 mm. Adults have been recorded in January.

Etymology
The species name is derived from the country of origin, Ecuador.

References

Opostegidae
Moths described in 2007
Moths of South America